Estádio Nicolau Alayon, also known as Estádio Comendador Sousa, is a football stadium located in the Brazilian city of São Paulo, São Paulo state. It is the home stadium of Brazilian football club Nacional Atlético Clube, also known as Nacional (SP).

Audax São Paulo and rugby union team Cobras Brasil XV has also used the stadium for their home games. It has a maximum capacity of 9,660. The stadium is named after the Uruguayan Nicolau Alayon, who was Nacional's president during the stadium's construction. The stadium is nicknamed Comendador Sousa after the street where it is located in.

History
The stadium was inaugurated on May 14, 1938, when Corinthians beat Nacional 2–1. The first goal of the stadium was scored by Nacional's Carlos Leite.

The stadium's attendance record currently stands at 22,000, set on February 21, 1970, when Nacional beat São Paulo 1–0.

References

External links
 Image gallery on Instagram

Sports venues in São Paulo
Football venues in São Paulo
Tourist attractions in São Paulo